B.M.S. College of Engineering or Bhusanayana Mukundadas Sreenivasaiah College of Engineering (BMSCE) is a private engineering college in Basavanagudi, Bangalore, India. It was started in 1946 by Bhusanayana Mukundadas Sreenivasaiah and is run by the B.M.S. Educational Trust. It is affiliated with Visvesvaraya Technological University and became autonomous in 2008. BMSCE is located on Bull Temple Road, Basavanagudi, diagonally opposite to the famous Bull Temple. Though a private college, it is partially funded by the Government of Karnataka.

History 
BMSCE was founded in 1946 by B. M. Sreenivasaiah with three undergraduate courses namely mechanical, civil, and electrical engineering, as the first private sector initiative in engineering education in India. B. M. Sreenivasaiah was followed by his son B. S. Narayan.

Academic profile

Admission

Undergraduate 
Students are admitted to undergraduate courses on basis of their performance in either Karnataka Common Entrance Test , or in the COMED-K test. There is a lateral entry scheme in place, by which students holding diploma degrees can enter directly to the second year of study in engineering. Students, upon graduating, receive a Bachelor of Engineering degree.

Graduate 
Students are admitted to postgraduate courses on basis of their GATE test scores, as well as on their Post Graduate Karnataka CET scores. Students, upon graduating, receive a Master of Computer Applications (M.C.A.) or Master of Technology (M.Tech.) degree. They also offer a Master of Business Administration (MBA) degree.

Rankings 

BMSCE was ranked 83rd by the National Institutional Ranking Framework (NIRF) engineering ranking in 2022. It was ranked 24th among engineering colleges by India Today in 2020.

Departments and courses

Undergraduate
These departments offer four-year undergraduate courses in engineering. All of the undergraduate courses have been conferred autonomous status by the Visvesvaraya Technological University. The following programmes are offered: Aerospace Engineering, Bio-technology, Chemical Engineering, Civil Engineering. Computer Science, Electronics and Communication Engineering, Electrical And Electronics Engineering, Industrial Engineering and Management, Information Science, Electronics and Instrumentation Engineering, Artificial intelligence and Machine learning, Mechanical Engineering and Electronics and Telecommunication Engineering. The allied departments of the college are the departments of Physics, Chemistry, Mathematics, Humanities along with the placement and training department.

Postgraduate
Master of Computer Applications (M.C.A.), Master of Technology (M.Tech.) offered by departments of Computer science, Information science, Mechanical and Electronics and Communication Engineering. They offer a Master of Business Administration (MBA) course as well.

Research and Development Centre 
R and D Center involves in identifying new research areas, developing projects leading to publications in national/international journals and conferences. Established an RandD centre at the institution level to promote research and innovation among the faculty and students. The centre helps in developing co-operative and complimentary research among various Departments under BMSCE to explore advanced technologies. The centre acts as the liaison between the university (VTU and Mangalore University) and the research centres at BMSCE. The centre also guides and facilitates in writing of project proposals, and scientific papers leading to publication as well as in identifying the research outcomes of research for filing patents.

Since academic autonomy, the institution has provided with an excellent opportunity to create, revise, redesign or introduce innovations in the curriculum. Threading this path, the Institution foregrounded the concept of research amongst the students from the first year of their program. The centralised labs and design centres titled propel labs were established for nurturing research from the first year of engineering. These labs are broad based and not confined to a single area/discipline. Student groups (multidisciplinary) work on various engineering projects in these labs - concept to designing the prototype. The Propel labs are open for students of all disciplines with no terms or conditions attached. Each Lab is headed by a faculty and supported by competent technical staffs who volunteer to act as mentors for the students and ensure that students conduct the research. Creative thinking skills of the students and mentoring by faculty guides result in the development creating systematic processes and products. These research labs help the students to build prototypes which enable them to participate in competitions both in India and abroad.

Student Life

Utsav Annual Cultural Fest 

Utsav is the cultural and signature festival of the BMS College of Engineering. It is usually held towards the end of August every year. Started in 1973 by a group of students, it has attracted considerable media attention and numerous sponsors over time. There are participants from institutes in other states like IIT Madras and IIT Bombay. Some of the events that pulled the crowds on day two were the rock concert and gaming competitions. Bands like Parousia, Escher’s Knot, The Bicycle Days, All the Fat Children, Requiem and Solder were among those that entertained the city’s rock music fans. The fest also features events like western and Indian dances, quizzes, technical events, theatre, Mad Ads, face painting, debate, dumb charades and rangoli. There are also stalls selling products made by BMSCE students. The money obtained by selling the products will be donated to Navachetana Trust, an NGO.

Accreditation 
The college was accredited by National Assessment and Accreditation Council (NAAC) with an A++ in the Second Cycle : with a CGPA of 3.83 on a scale of four which is highest in the country. The re-accreditation status is valid from 28.03.2019 to 28.03.2024. It is accredited by National Assessment and Accreditation Council (NAAC) with A++ grade. Most of the college courses are accredited by the National Board of Accreditation (NBA). The college is affiliated with Visvesvaraya Technological University.

Notable alumni

References

External links
BMSIT Official website
BMSCE Official website

Engineering colleges in Bangalore
All India Council for Technical Education
Affiliates of Visvesvaraya Technological University
1946 establishments in India
Educational institutions established in 1946